John Robert Novotny (January 29, 1918 – July 14, 2006) was an American professional basketball player. Novotny played in the National Basketball League for one game, appearing for the Pittsburgh Raiders during the 1944–45 season. He played college basketball at Appalachian State University.

References

External links
 John Novotny obituary

1918 births
2006 deaths
American men's basketball players
Appalachian State Mountaineers men's basketball players
Basketball players from Pennsylvania
Guards (basketball)
People from Braddock, Pennsylvania
People from Jeannette, Pennsylvania
Pittsburgh Raiders players